An all-time medal table for all Youth Olympic Games (YOG) from 2010 to 2018 is tabulated below. This is a summary of medal tables published by IOC on every YOG edition. A total of 126 nations have won at least one medal in the Youth Olympic Games, 124 in the Summer Games and 33 in the Winter Games.

Combined Total
Last updated after the 2020 Winter Youth Olympics.

By Games

Summer Games 
As of 2018 Summer Youth Olympics.

Winter Games
As of 2020 Winter Youth Olympics.

See also
 All-time Olympic Games medal table
 All-time Paralympic Games medal table
 All-time Universiade medal table

References

External links 
 Youth Olympic Games